John Sebright may refer to:
John Sebright (Totnes MP), English Member of Parliament for Totnes in 1413
Sir John Sebright, 6th Baronet (1725–1794), British Army general
Sir John Sebright, 7th Baronet (1767–1846), British politician and landowner, son of the above